Fred Gerber is an American film and television director and television producer. Gerber has directed several popular television series which include The X-Files, Desperate Housewives and House. Gerber has also served as a producer on China Beach, Threat Matrix, Family Law and The Lying Game.

Filmography
Witches of East End (2013) TV series
episode 1.03 "A Few Good Talismen"
Haven (2010–11) TV series
episode 1.13 "Spiral"
episode 2.06 "Audery Parker's Day Off"
The Lying Game (2011–13) TV series
episode 1.06 "Bad Boys Break Hearts"
episode 1.11 "O Twin, Where Art Thou?"
episode 1.14 "Black and White and Green All Over"
episode 1.20 "Unholy Matrimony"
episode 2.01 "The Revengers"
episode 2.10 "To Lie For"
The Inside (2005) TV series
episode 1.07 "Declawed"
House (2004) TV series
episode 1.16 "Heavy"
episode 2.06 "Spin"
episode 2.17 "All In"
Desperate Housewives (2004) TV series
episode 1.06 "Running to Stand Still"
episode 1.08 "Guilty"
episode 1.10 "Come Back to Me"
North Shore (2004) TV series
episode 1.20 "Ex-Games, The"
Threat Matrix (2003) TV Series
Hack (2002) TV series
Family Law (1999) TV series
episode 1.03 "All God's Creatures"
episode 1.06 "Nanny, The"
episode 1.09 "Holt vs. Holt"
episode 1.13 "Human Error"
episode 1.17 "Metamorphosis"
episode 1.19 "Playing God"
episode 1.21 "Second Chance"
episode 2.02 "One Mistake"
episode 2.03 "Affairs of State"
episode 2.04 "Going Home"
episode 2.10 "Generations"
episode 2.13 "Separation"
episode 2.16 "Liar's Club: Part 2"
episode 2.22 "Recovery"
episode 3.01 "Irreparable Harm"
episode 3.02 "Moving On"
episode 3.05 "Against All Odds"
episode 3.08 "Security"
episode 3.13 "To Protect and to Serve"
episode 3.16 "Celano v. Foster"
episode 3.17 "Big Brother"
episode 3.19 "Admissions"
episode 3.21 "Alienation of Affection"
Judging Amy (1999) TV Series
episode 4.16 "Sixteen Going on Seventeen"
episode 5.20 "Slade's Chophouse"
episode 6.03 "Legacy"
Coming Unglued (1999) TV film
Total Recall 2070 (1999) TV series
Code Name: Eternity (1999) TV series
episode "Ethaniel's Story"
Family Plan (1998)
Eerie, Indiana: The Other Dimension (1998) TV series
Mr. Music (1998) (TV)
Prison of Secrets (1997) TV film
Breaking Through (1996) TV film
Race Against Time: The Search for Sarah (1996) TV film
Closer and Closer (1996) TV film
Rent-a-Kid (1995) (TV)
ER (1994) TV series
episode 1.21 "House of Cards"
episode 1.23 "Love Among the Ruins"
Due South (1994) TV film
The X-Files (1993) TV Series
episode 1.11 "Eve"
The Adventures of Brisco County, Jr. (1993) TV series
The Commish (1991) TV Series
Reasonable Doubts (1991) TV series
Law & Order (1990) TV Series
episode 1.21 "Sonata for a Solo Organ"
episode 2.01 "Confession"
episode 2.17 "Sisters of Mercy"
episode 4.09 "Born Bad"
episode 5.06 "Competence"
episode 6.06 "Paranoia"
Gabriel's Fire (1990) TV series
episode "Postcards from the Faultline"
Midnight Caller (1988) TV series
episode "Ryder on the Storm"
China Beach (1988) TV series

References

External links

American film directors
American television directors
American television producers
Living people
Place of birth missing (living people)
Year of birth missing (living people)